Browser was a library cat that was kept in White Settlement Public Library, in Fort Worth, Texas, United States.

Description 
Browser was a grey tabby cat.

Library mousing 
Browser was adopted by White Settlement Public Library from a local animal shelter in October 2010. Originally he was obtained to control rodents, but later became a mascot of the library, featuring in the library's fundraising calendar.

On June 14, 2016, White Settlement City Council voted by a majority of two to one votes, to remove Browser from the library. The removal motion was made by councilor Elzie Clements, who was concerned about triggering people with allergies to cats. White Settlement mayor Ron White claimed that the motion to remove Browser was a response to a council worker not being permitted to bring his puppy to the City Hall. 

In response to the eviction decision, a petition to permit Browser to remain in the library attracted over 12,000 signatures and mayor White received over 1,500 emails advocating for Browser to be permitted to remain in the library. On July 1, 2016, White Settlement City Council unanimously voted to reverse its earlier eviction decision. In December 13, 2016, Clements again tried to bring council to vote to remove Browser, but the motion did not pass.

Browser was subsequently identified by the mayor as "Library Cat for Life".

See also
 List of individual cats

References

External links 
 White Settlement Public Library

Individual cats in the United States
Male mammals